Nereju is a commune located in Vrancea County, Romania. It is composed of five villages: Brădăcești, Chiricani (or Chiricari), Nereju, Nereju Mic and Sahastru.

Nereju, Nereju Mic and Brădăcești lie along the Zăbala River, while Chiricani and Sahastru are situated on the surrounding hills and valleys.

History

2020 Earthquake 
On January 31, 2020, a magnitude 4.8 earthquake struck 5 kilometers WNW of the town.  The official time of the earthquake was 01:26:47 (UTC).

Economy
Main economic activities are in the wood industry (the surrounding hills are rich in coniferous forests), mountainous ecological agriculture, mountainous tourism, folk arts and traditions.

Tourism
Main touristic sights are:
Lacul Negru - a natural lake, with an area of 1 hectare, depth 10m, and situated at an altitude of 1350m
Mountainous areas Dealul Negru (Black Hill) and Lapoș, at an altitude of 1400m
Căldările Zăbalei (Zăbala's Buckets) - a protected area, along Zăbala river's course

Chipărușul is a local artistic group which features pre-Christian rituals involving masks and other folkloric elements.

The DJ 205 D road was improved in 2016; the county seat Focșani is some 75 km distant along this route.

References

Communes in Vrancea County
Localities in Western Moldavia